Christine Newton (born 13 February 1956) is a New Zealand former professional tennis player.

While competing on tour in the 1970s and 1980s, Newton featured in the main draws of four grand slam tournaments, which included a doubles semi-final appearances at the 1979 Australian Open (with Jenny Walker). She played in the singles second round of the 1976 Wimbledon Championships, losing to Mona Guerrant.

Newton won a doubles title at the Auckland Open in 1978 and was the singles runner-up in 1981.

From 1975 to 1981 she competed in Federation Cup ties for New Zealand, playing in a total of 19 rubbers.

References

External links
 
 
 

1956 births
Living people
New Zealand female tennis players
20th-century New Zealand women